Christian Friedrich may refer to:
Christian Friedrich (baseball) (born 1987), American baseball player
Christian Friedrich (bobsleigh) (born 1981), German bobsledder
Christian Friedrich, Baron Stockmar (1787–1863), Anglo-Belgian statesman

See also

 Friedrich Christian (disambiguation)